Catanduvas is a city in Santa Catarina, Brazil. As of 2020, the estimated population was 10,984.

References

Municipalities in Santa Catarina (state)